Henry Larsen may refer to:

Henry Larsen (explorer) (1899–1964), Canadian Arctic explorer
CCGS Henry Larsen, Canadian Coast Guard icebreaker
Henry Larsen (Norwegian rower) (1891–?), Norwegian rower at the 1912 and 1920 Summer Olympics
Henry Larsen (Danish rower) (1916–2002), Danish rower at the 1948 Summer Olympics
Henry Kristian Larsen (1914–1986), Danish field hockey player
Henry Louis Larsen (1890–1962), United States Marine Corps General and Governor of Guam

See also
Harry Larsen (1915–1974), Danish rower at the 1936 Summer Olympics
Henry Larssen (1871–?), Norwegian judge